The Federal Medical Center (FMC) Fort Worth is an administrative-security United States federal prison in Fort Worth, Texas, for male inmates of all security levels with special medical and mental health needs. It is operated by the Federal Bureau of Prisons, a division of the United States Department of Justice.

Originally opening as a Federal Correctional Institution in 1971, the institution was converted to a Federal Medical Center in 1994. At the end of 2006, FMC Fort Worth was returned to FCI status. As of 2017, FMC Fort Worth was again converted back to a Federal Medical Center.

Notable incidents
In February 2012, Michele O'Neal, a correctional officer at the facility, resigned after being charged with sexual abuse of a ward for engaging in a consensual sexual relationship with an inmate at the facility, whom the Federal Bureau of Prisons did not identify. O'Neal pleaded guilty in July, was assigned inmate number 44097-177, and was released in April 2013.

In October 2012, inmate Phillip Monroe Ballard, 71, was charged with soliciting the murder-for-hire of U.S. District Judge John McBryde from FCI Fort Worth. The indictment alleges that Ballard, who was scheduled to go on trial for tax charges before Judge McBryde, approached another inmate about killing Judge McBryde because Ballard believed that McBryde would sentence him to 20 years in prison. The inmate reported Ballard's statement to prison officials and began working as a confidential source for the FBI. The inmate told Ballard that he knew a man on the outside who would do it, upon which Ballard offered to pay the inmate $100,000 in cash and provided him with detailed instructions, such as how it could be done with a high-powered rifle and scope, and even provided a contingency plan of planting a bomb in the judge's vehicle to the inmate. The inmate gave Ballard a handwritten letter from an undercover agent posing as the "killer", which included contact information and notice that the "work" would be completed upon receipt of $5,000. Ballard called the undercover agent four times on September 26, 2012, and the following day, Ballard directed that the $5,000 payment be sent to the address provided by the undercover agent. On March 17, 2014, Ballard was sentenced to 20 years imprisonment.

Notable inmates (current and former)
† Inmates in the Federal Witness Protection Program are not listed on the Federal Bureau of Prisons website.

Terrorists

Organized crime figures

Corrupt public officials

Others

See also

List of United States federal prisons
Federal Bureau of Prisons
Incarceration in the United States

References

External links
 Federal Correctional Institution, Fort Worth
 Federal Bureau of Prisons inmate locator

Prisons in Texas
Federal Correctional Institutions in the United States
Buildings and structures in Fort Worth, Texas
1971 establishments in Texas
United States Marine Hospitals